The lacrosse competition at the 2022 World Games took place in July 2022, in Birmingham in United States, at the University of Alabama Birmingham.
Originally scheduled to take place in July 2021, the Games were rescheduled for July 2022 as a result of the 2020 Summer Olympics postponement due to the COVID-19 pandemic.
 Women's tournament was played as official event and men's tournament as invitational event. This was the first time, when both men's and women's field lacrosse were played in a six-a-side format. This was also an absolute debut of the men's tournament in World Games programme, because in 2017 women's played for the first time in the history of this discipline in the World Games. The games were played in a  Sixes format, with both teams having six players on the field. The game was played in eight-minute quarters and emphasizes speed and efficiency.

Qualification
A total of 8 teams for each gender competed in the lacrosse event at the 2022 World Games.

Qualification for the men's tournament of the 2022 World Games was based primarily on final placement at the 2018 World Lacrosse Championship. The Iroquois team, who took third at the 2018 championship, were initially disqualified as the Iroquois confederacy does not have a National Olympic Committee; after the ruling was overturned, the Irish team vacated their place in their favour. Lacrosse was invented by Indigenous nations including the Iroquois or Haudenosaunee peoples, and the game has spiritual significance for them.

For the women's tournament, the 2021 World Lacrosse Women's World Championship was supposed to be the basis for qualification. Like their men's counterpart, the Iroquois women's national lacrosse team will be eligible to qualify. However the Women's World Championship was postponed to July 2022.

Women's teams

Men's teams

Results

Medal table

Medalists

Men's tournament
Group A

Group B

Knockout stage
Seventh place game

Fifth place game

Semifinals

Bronze Medal Game

Gold Medal Game

Women's tournament
Group A

Group B

Knockout stage
Seventh place game

Fifth place game

Semifinals

Bronze medal game

Gold medal game

References

External links
 The World Games 2022
 Results book

 
2022 World Games